The discography of American singer Bobby V consists of 6 studio albums, 2 extended plays, 1 soundtrack album, and 20 singles.

Albums

Studio albums

Extended plays

Collaboration albums

Soundtrack albums

Mixtapes

Singles

As lead artist

As featured artist

Guest appearances

References

Discographies of American artists
Rhythm and blues discographies